The Rungwa are an ethnic and linguistic group based in the Mpanda District of Rukwa Region in western Tanzania.  In 1987 the Rungwa population was estimated to number 18,000 .

Ethnic groups in Tanzania
Indigenous peoples of East Africa